St. Elizabeth’s Boarding School for Indian Children was established in 1886 and remained in operation until 1967. It was located in the Wakpala area of the Standing Rock Reservation in South Dakota. This school was one of many schools established across the United States as part of an incentive to integrate Native Americans into the American Culture. St. Elizabeth's boarding school was one of the religious boarding schools from the Episcopal Church. The environment for education was harsh and difficult. Children were often forced to learn how to do manual labor and to abandon their culture.  There were many prominent teachers and leaders at St. Elizabeths Indian School. Instructors like Mary Frances helped organize the children and keep the school running. There were also different school administrators over the years that had different strategies on how to instruct the children and also had different opinions on Native Americans.  Daily life at this school was interesting and varied between the boys and the girls and what day of the week it was. One problem was that they lacked the resources to care for the children. The students would do manual labor to support the school. On Sundays they were expected to attend church services. Where they would sing hymns and read in there native language. This may have been the only opportunity for them to get a glimpse of there families, although they were not allowed to see them or talk to them. Sundays were also a more relaxed day where they could play and sleep longer. The education and focus of the curriculum was to help Native American Children assimilate as was the goal of the U.S. Government at the time. Students took classes like English, literature, and geography.

History of Indian education 
The United States government has continuously sought to change and replace Indian culture, and education has played a large role in this effort. Colonial leaders believed that by educating Native Americans, it would improve their trade relations with them and also make them better people.

The idea for Indian boarding schools came from Herbert Welsh and Henry Pancoast. They were considered middle class reformers and helped to pass other Indian policies. The purpose of Indian Boarding schools was to reform Native Americans and force them to assimilate into the country's dominant culture. The government planned to do this by teaching the students modern western education and manners. Boarding schools also taught students Catholic and Protestant ways. In the 1880s and 90s, church-led schools were given federal funding. The motto of the schools was “Kill the Indian, Save the Man.”

The first school was opened on the Yakima Indian Reservation in the state of Washington in 1860. However, the first school to be federally funded was the Carlisle Indian Industrial School. Carlisle opened in November 1879 and had 147 students. At this time, most Native Americans were living in poverty and couldn’t afford to feed their children. This is why some would say there was tremendous success with these schools and the number of students they had.

In 1891 the federal government passed a compulsory attendance law that required Native American children to attend boarding schools. In their effort to force assimilation, they would coerce families to follow this law and send their children to boarding schools by withholding rations, annuities and other goods.  The Commissioner of Indian Affairs Francis Leupp still supported the use of coercion in bringing children to boarding schools as late as 1907, but around this time the support for Indian boarding schools started to decrease in favor of reservation day schools. However, it was still common for Native American children to attend boarding schools into the 1930s. 

In 1928 a survey was taken of Indian affairs and produced as the Meriam report. This report uncovered the poor conditions in Indian Boarding schools across the country. The report also states that at the time it was conducted the percent of Native American children attending schools was lower than that of white children. 

In-between the dates of 1819 and 1969 there were over 400 boarding schools across the country. These schools had a huge impact on the culture of Native Americans. There are many that are still suffering from the effects of boarding school education.

Notable people

Reverend Philip Deloria 
Philip Deloria was the first Reverend at St Elizabeth’s as well as the longest. Deloria was born in South Dakota on the Yankton Reservation and eventually converted to Christianity. There are differing accounts of his life. One depicts Deloria’s conversion as a grand turning point in his life when he abandoned his traditional roots, but another written by his grandson claims that these roots underlay everything that Deloria did.

Ella Deloria 
Ella Deloria was Reverend Philip Deloria’s daughter and also played a role in the culture of St. Elizabeth’s. She attended the school as a child and then later became its director in the 1950s. Ella Deloria felt that Indians were in the process of transitioning from the old ways to the new. She felt that the school’s job was to help Indians’ do this, and that the Indian education system wasn’t academically rigorous enough to do the job. Deloria believed that Indians needed to become more modernized and acquire the costumes and habits of a modern United States. As part of this attitude, she disliked the kinship culture that united Indians. She felt that it stood in the way of their forward progress and complicated things at the school.

William Chapman 
William Chapman succeeded Ella Deloria as the director of St. Elizabeth’s Boarding School. He was the director from 1958 until 1960. Chapman didn’t like the Indians. He found working with the Sioux people frustrating and felt that it was he and his wife against everyone else. He believed that his feelings were their fault, since they clung to old ways instead of embracing change and becoming more modern. Chapman is an example of many of the people that worked in Indian Boarding Schools in general. They caused a lot of confusion and difficulties because they held the children in contempt and didn’t understand the culture the students were coming from.

Mary Francis 
Miss Mary Francis was the principal and headteacher at St. Elizabeth’s for seventeen years. She was from New York but came to serve as a missionary to the western Sioux, where she spent twenty-seven years. While at the boarding school, Miss Mary Francis lived there and was in charge of many aspects of life for the children. She taught classes, organized the schedule, and set other protocols. Miss Mary Francis supported the idea that the school should be like a home to the students, meaning that it should show them what her idea of a good home looked like. She also made sure that students and teachers were strict in speaking English. Miss Mary Francis returned to New York in 1907.

Bishop William Hobart Hare 
Bishop Hare created a set of guidelines for Episcopal Indian boarding schools. St. Elizabeth's was also constructed under his direction.

Daily life 
St. Elizabeth’s Boarding School tried to have a home and farm like atmosphere. The goal of Episcopal boarding schools was to model a “perfect” home for the children and show them what a good home looked like. The children participated in tasks around the school that were supposed to help them learn to become good farmers and housewives, and members of the mainstream American community.  Assimilationists believed that if children were allowed to return home it would make the assimilation process harder, so visits from parents or relatives were infrequent. 

The boarding schools also had inadequate resources to care for the children. This meant that the students had to work to support the school. They spent as much as half of the day working instead of learning. The Meriam report proposes that the work done may have been contrary to the child labor laws at the time. It also required the students to work long hours and limited their free time to almost nothing.

Week day 
Students at St. Elizabeth’s Boarding School started their day with four hours of work. They were tasked to clean their living space, cook, cut wood, among other things. Then at 10am they started their academic studies. They studied for two hours and then had lunch. After lunch, the children went back to learning “practical things” and working around the school. Once those were completed they returned to their academic studies.

The schedule at St. Elizabeth's mirrored that of other boarding schools. For example, at the Cherokee Female Seminary students woke up at 5:30 and cleaned and studied during the day, though they completed less physical labor than at St. Elizabeth's.

In 1916 the Bureau of Indian Affairs (BIA) laid out a curriculum for boarding schools. This curriculum specified what the students needed to do each day and how long teachers were to spend on each subject. For example, first grade students spend 110 minutes studying English each day.

Sunday 
On Sundays, the students' schedule was more relaxed. They were able to sleep in, and their work was simpler in the mornings. Then they would attend church. Students at Indian boarding schools had to attend church services each Sunday. Unlike classes, church services and other religious texts, including hymns, were allowed to be in native Indian languages. At St. Elizabeth’s church services were held in Lakota and English. The hymnals and prayer books were also in Lakota. 

Student's families would come to the same community church as the students, and the students would try to spot their families. However, they weren't allowed to talk to their families or leave the organization of the school. Even after the services, they weren't allowed to spend time with their families and instead went back to the school for lunch. 

In the afternoons after the services, the students had some free time and were allowed to play.

Academic instruction 
When Indian boarding schools were first established, there was a lot of confusion over who was in charge and there were many different ways that church and state balanced the maintenance of the schools. When they had to decide what to teach Native American students, schools generally taught the same subjects as schools for white children. The main areas of study were reading, writing, mathematics, and geography. All classes were held in English, because the Commissioner of Indian Affairs required it. Teaching the classes in English, and the subjects chosen were because it seemed logical, and because it supported their mission to get rid of Indian culture. Since the boarding school was a Christian institution, students also learned religious topics.

In 1902 the academic curriculum was specified by the federal government. Their goal was to unite the practical education that was the main focus of Indian boarding schools with the academic.  

The boarding school system provided Native American students with poor education and care. Many students felt that they weren't receiving an education equal to those in public schools. The school's focus wasn't meaningful education. There was greater focus placed on influencing the way that Native American children viewed the world and changing their culture than teaching them academic subjects.

Practical instruction 
Students were taught skills that the school’s creators thought would help them to become hardworking and successful members of society. These things included sewing, cleaning, etc.

Practical Instruction differed based on gender. On Saturdays, the girls at the school would do all the laundry, including for the boys. They also helped with mending clothes and cleaning everything such as the bathrooms and floors. The boys on the other hand would get water from town, chop wood, and take care of the animals.

See also 
American Indian boarding schools

References 

Wikipedia Student Program
Native American boarding schools
Native American history of South Dakota
Assimilation of indigenous peoples of North America
Educational institutions established in 1886